Common names: Oaxacan small-headed rattlesnake.

Crotalus intermedius gloydi is a subspecies of venomous pitviper in the family Viperidae. The subspecies is endemic to Mexico in the states of Oaxaca and Puebla.

Etymology
The subspecific name, gloydi, is in honor of American herpetologist Howard K. Gloyd.

Description
This subspecies, Crotalus intermedius gloydi, can be identified by its scalation. It is characterized by having the postnasal scale in broad contact with the first supralabial scale. Also, the postnasal is usually not in contact with any other supralabial scale.

Geographic range
Crotalus intermedius gloydi is found in Mexico, in south, central and northern Oaxaca, as well as in central Puebla.

The type locality given is "Cerro San Felipe (elevation 10,000 ft. [= 3,048 m]) near [15 km northwest of] Oaxaca, Oaxaca, Mexico".

References

Further reading
Taylor EH (1941). "Herpetological Miscellany, No. II". Univ. Kansas Sci. Bull. 27 (7): 105-132 + Plates III-VI. (Crotalus triseriatus gloydi, new subspecies, pp. 130–132, text figure 7).

External links

intermedius gloydi
Endemic reptiles of Mexico
Fauna of the Sierra Madre de Oaxaca